Lélex is a commune in the Ain department in eastern France.

Mountain sports

Lélex is known as the highest ski resort of the Jura Mountains (1680 m).

Population

See also
Communes of the Ain department

References

Communes of Ain
Ain communes articles needing translation from French Wikipedia